In mathematics, the convolution theorem states that under suitable conditions the Fourier transform of a convolution of two functions (or signals) is the pointwise product of their Fourier transforms. More generally, convolution in one domain (e.g., time domain) equals point-wise multiplication in the other domain (e.g., frequency domain). Other versions of the convolution theorem are applicable to various Fourier-related transforms.

Functions of a continuous variable 

where  denotes the Fourier transform operator. The transform may be normalized in other ways, in which case constant scaling factors (typically  or ) will appear in the convolution theorem below.

In this context the asterisk denotes convolution, instead of standard multiplication. The tensor product symbol  is sometimes used instead.

The convolution theorem states that:

Applying the inverse Fourier transform , produces the corollary:

The theorem also generally applies to multi-dimensional functions.

This theorem also holds for the Laplace transform, the two-sided Laplace transform and, when suitably modified, for the Mellin transform and Hartley transform (see Mellin inversion theorem).  It can be extended to the Fourier transform of abstract harmonic analysis defined over locally compact abelian groups.

Periodic convolution (Fourier series coefficients) 
   and   

The Fourier series coefficients are:

where  denotes the Fourier series integral.
The convolution: is also -periodic, and is called a periodic convolution.  The corresponding convolution theorem is:

Functions of a discrete variable (sequences) 
By a derivation similar to Eq.1, there is an analogous theorem for sequences, such as samples of two continuous functions, where now  denotes the discrete-time Fourier transform (DTFT) operator.

The convolution theorem for discrete sequences is:

Periodic convolution 
Consider -periodic sequences  and :
   and   

The discrete convolution:

is also -periodic, and is called a periodic convolution. Redefining the  operator as the -length DFT, the corresponding theorem is:

And therefore:

Under the right conditions, it is possible for this N-length sequence to contain a distortion-free segment of a  convolution.

For  and  sequences whose non-zero duration is less than or equal to  a final simplification is:

This form is often used to efficiently implement numerical convolution by computer.  (see  and )

As a partial reciprocal, it has been shown  that any linear transform that turns convolution into pointwise product is the DFT (up to a permutation of coefficients).

Convolution theorem for inverse Fourier transform
Note that in the example below "" represents the Hadamard product, and "" represents a convolution between the two matrices. There is also a convolution theorem for the inverse Fourier transform

so that

Convolution theorem for tempered distributions
The convolution theorem extends to tempered distributions. 
Here,  is an arbitrary tempered distribution (e.g. the Dirac comb)

Equivalently, if  is a smooth "slowly growing" ordinary function, it guarantees the existence of both, multiplication and convolution product.

In particular, every compactly supported tempered distribution, such as the Dirac Delta, is "rapidly decreasing". Equivalently, bandlimited functions, such as the function that is constantly  are smooth "slowly growing" ordinary functions. If, for example,  is the Dirac comb both equations yield the Poisson summation formula and if, furthermore,  is the Dirac delta then  is constantly one and these equations yield the Dirac comb identity.

See also 
 Moment-generating function of a random variable

Notes

References

Further reading

Additional resources 
For a visual representation of the use of the convolution theorem in signal processing, see:

Johns Hopkins University's Java-aided simulation: http://www.jhu.edu/signals/convolve/index.html

Theorems in Fourier analysis
Articles containing proofs

de:Faltung (Mathematik)#Faltungstheorem 2
fr:Produit de convolution